Albert Richard Brown (14 February 1911 – 1985) was an English footballer who played as a winger for Rochdale, Sheffield Wednesday (reserve team), Queens Park Rangers,  Northampton Town and Nottingham Forest. He also played non-league football for Alnwick United and Blythe Spartans.

References

Rochdale A.F.C. players
Sheffield Wednesday F.C. players
Queens Park Rangers F.C. players
Northampton Town F.C. players
Nottingham Forest F.C. players
Blyth Spartans A.F.C. players
People from Pegswood
Footballers from Northumberland
1911 births
1985 deaths
English footballers
Association footballers not categorized by position